The Men's double FITA round team 1A-6 was an archery competition at the 1984 Summer Paralympics.

The Belgian team won the gold medal.

Results

References

1984 Summer Paralympics events